Baby Follies was a French children's animated series first broadcast in 1993–94.

Plot
Baby Town is a city where babies have adventures before storks come to take them to the world of adults.

International broadcast
Baby Follies was dubbed into several languages:
Baby Folies (Spanish, Latin America)
Bebés em Festa (Portugal)
Bobaskowo ("Baby-doll", Poland)
Locuras de Bebés ("Baby Madness", Spanish, Spain)
Tír na hÓige ("Land of Youth", Irish language, Ireland)
 (Tinokot BaTzameret, "Babies at the Top", Israel)
婴儿城 / 嬰兒城 (Yīng'ér Chéng, "Baby City", Chinese)
තොත්ත බබාලා (“Babies”, Sinhala, Sri Lanka)

References

External links

TV Tropes Wiki page

1993 French television series debuts
1994 French television series endings
Canal+ original programming
1990s French animated television series
French children's animated comedy television series